These are the squads for the countries that played in the 1957 South American Championship. The participating countries were Argentina, Brazil, Chile, Colombia, Ecuador, Peru and Uruguay. Bolivia and Paraguay withdrew from the tournament. The teams plays in a single round-robin tournament, earning two points for a win, one point for a draw, and zero points for a loss.

Argentina
Head Coach:  Guillermo Stábile

Brazil
Head Coach:  Osvaldo Brandão

Chile 
Head Coach:  José Salerno

Colombia
Head Coach:  Pedro López

Ecuador 
Head Coach:  Eduardo Spandre

Peru
Head Coach:  György Orth

Uruguay
Head Coach:  Juan López

References

Squads
Copa América squads